Baldwin II of Boulogne († ) was a son of Arnulf III, Count of Boulogne, whom he succeeded as count of Boulogne.

Life

Baldwin II was the son of Arnulf III, Count of Boulogne and succeeded his father as count circa 990. Both Arnulf III and his father Arnulf II had freed themselves of Flemish rule during the minority of Baldwin IV, Count of Flanders. In 1022 both Baldwin and his son Eustace, along with the counts of Normandy, Valois, and Flanders, met with Robert II, King of France and formed an alliance against Odo II, Count of Blois who was challenging the king's authority. But when Emperor Henry II died in July 1024 the alliance quickly fell apart as King Robert reconciled with count Odo II. In the wake of these changing alliances and for reasons that remain unclear, Baldwin was killed in battle c. 1027 warring with Enguerrand I, Count of Ponthieu, who then wed Baldwin's widow.

Family and issue

He married Adelina of Holland, possibly the daughter of Arnulf, Count of Holland and Lutgardis of Luxemburg. and was the father of: 

 Eustace I of Boulogne, who succeeded him.

After Baldwin's death Adelina married secondly, Enguerrand I, Count of Ponthieu.

References

10th-century births
1020s deaths
10th-century French people
11th-century French people
Counts of Boulogne
House of Flanders